The following ships of the Royal Navy has borne the name Answer or HMS Answer:

 Answer (1590) was a 21-gun galleon built in 1590, rebuilt in 1604 and sold in 1629.

Royal Navy ship names